In the mathematical field of differential geometry, Euler's theorem is a result on the curvature of curves on a surface. The theorem establishes the existence of principal curvatures and associated principal directions which give the directions in which the surface curves the most and the least.

More precisely, let M be a surface in three-dimensional Euclidean space, and p a point on M.  A normal plane through p is a plane passing through the point p containing the normal vector to M.  Through each (unit) tangent vector to M at p, there passes a normal plane PX which cuts out a curve in M.  That curve has a certain curvature κX when regarded as a curve inside PX.  Provided not all κX are equal, there is some unit vector X1 for which k1 = κX1 is as large as possible, and another unit vector X2 for which k2 = κX2 is as small as possible.  Euler's theorem asserts that X1 and X2 are perpendicular and that, moreover, if X is any vector making an angle θ with X1, then

The quantities k1 and k2 are called the principal curvatures, and X1 and X2 are the corresponding principal directions.  Equation is sometimes called Euler's equation .

See also
 Differential geometry of surfaces
 Dupin indicatrix

References
 Full 1909 text (now out of copyright)
.
 

Differential geometry of surfaces
Theorems in differential geometry
Leonhard Euler